In Greek mythology, Ate, Até or Aite (Ancient Greek: Ἄτη) was the goddess of mischief, delusion, ruin, and blind folly, rash action and reckless impulse who led men down the path of ruin. She also led both gods and men to rash and inconsiderate actions and to suffering.

Description
In the Iliad, Achilles describes Ate as she "that blindeth all—a power fraught with bane; delicate are her feet, for it is not upon the ground that she fareth, but she walketh over the heads of men, bringing men to harm, and this one or that she ensnareth."

Family 
Homer called Ate the eldest daughter of Zeus, with no mother mentioned. While, according to Hesiod's Theogony, Ate was the daughter of Eris, the goddess of strife, with no father mentioned:

Of these offspring of Eris, all personified abstractions, only Ate has any actual identity.

Aeschylus, in his tragedy Agamennon, has the Chorus call Peitho "the unendurable child of scheming Ruin [Ἄτας]".

Mythology

Banishment 
On Hera's instigation, Ate used her influence over Zeus so that he swore an oath that on that day a great mortal man descended from him would be born (brought into the light by Eileithyia, goddess of "birth-pangs"), who would become lord of all men who dwell about him (the Argives). Hera immediately arranged to delay the birth of Heracles to Alcmene and bring forth Eurystheus prematurely (to whom Heracles would later become subject), born to Nicippe (unnamed), wife of Sthenelus. In anger, Zeus flung Ate by her hair down to earth, from the starry heavens, forever forbidding her return to Mount Olympus and heaven (the starry sky). Ate then wandered about, treading on the heads of men rather than on the earth, wreaking havoc and delusion amongst mortals.

The Bibliotheca claims that when thrown down by Zeus, Ate landed on a peak in Phrygia called by her name. There Ilus later, following a cow, founded the city of Ilion, known as Troy. This flourish is chronologically at odds with Homer's dating of Ate's fall.

Other stories 
In the Argonautica, Hera says that "even the gods are sometimes visited by Ate".

In Nonnus's Dionysiaca, Ate, in order to gratify Hera, persuades the boy Ampelus whom Dionysus passionately loves, to impress Dionysus by riding on a bull from which Ampelus subsequently falls and breaks his neck.

Among the tragic writers, Ate appears in a different light: she avenges evil deeds and inflicts just punishments upon the offenders and their posterity, so that her character here is almost the same as that of Nemesis and Erinnys. She appears most prominent in the dramas of Aeschylus, and least in those of Euripides, with whom the idea of Dike (justice) is more fully developed.

A fragment from Empedocles refers to the "Meadow of Ate", which probably signifies the mortal world.

Post-classical
In the play Julius Caesar, Shakespeare introduces the goddess Ate as an invocation of vengeance and menace. Mark Antony, lamenting Caesar's murder, envisions:

Shakespeare also mentions her in the play Much Ado About Nothing, when Benedick says, referring to Beatrice,

So too, in King John, Shakespeare refers to Queen Eleanor as "An Ate stirring him  to blood and strife", and in Love's Labour's Lost Birone jeers "Pompey is moved. More Ates, more Ates! stir them on, stir them on!"

In Spenser's The Faerie Queene, a fiend from Hell disguised as a beautiful woman is called Ate. This is a possible parallel to the fallen angels.

See also
 Folly (allegory)
 Lucifer
 Nemesis
 111 Ate, a main-belt asteroid

Notes

References
 Aeschylus, Agamemnon, in Aeschylus: Oresteia: Agamemnon, Libation-Bearers, Eumenides, edited and translated by Alan H. Sommerstein, Loeb Classical Library No. 146. Cambridge, Massachusetts, Harvard University Press, 2009. . Online version at Harvard University Press.
Aeschylus, translated in two volumes. 2. Libation Bearers by Herbert Weir Smyth, Ph. D. Cambridge, Massachusetts. Harvard University Press. 1926. Online version at the Perseus Digital Library.
Apollodorus, The Library with an English Translation by Sir James George Frazer, F.B.A., F.R.S. in 2 Volumes, Cambridge, Massachusetts, Harvard University Press; London, William Heinemann Ltd. 1921. ISBN 0-674-99135-4. Online version at the Perseus Digital Library..
Apollonius Rhodius, Argonautica translated by Robert Cooper Seaton (1853–1915), R. C. Loeb Classical Library Volume 001. London, William Heinemann Ltd, 1912. Online version at the Topos Text Project.
Apollonius Rhodius, Argonautica. George W. Mooney. London. Longmans, Green. 1912.
Blünmer, Ueber Idee die des Schicksals, &c. p. 64,&c
Calasso, Roberto – The Marriage of Cadmus and Harmony
 Caldwell, Richard, Hesiod's Theogony, Focus Publishing/R. Pullins Company (June 1, 1987). .
 E. R. Dodds, The Greeks and the Irrational, University of California Press.
 Gantz, Timothy, Early Greek Myth: A Guide to Literary and Artistic Sources, Johns Hopkins University Press, 1996, Two volumes:  (Vol. 1),  (Vol. 2).
 Grimal, Pierre, The Dictionary of Classical Mythology, Wiley-Blackwell, 1996. . Internet Archive.
 Hesiod, Theogony, in The Homeric Hymns and Homerica with an English Translation by Hugh G. Evelyn-White, Cambridge, Massachusetts, Harvard University Press; London, William Heinemann Ltd. 1914. Online version at the Perseus Digital Library.
 Homer, The Iliad with an English Translation by A.T. Murray, Ph.D. in two volumes. Cambridge, Massachusetts, Harvard University Press; London, William Heinemann, Ltd. 1924. Online version at the Perseus Digital Library.
 Homer, Homeri Opera in five volumes. Oxford, Oxford University Press. 1920. .
 Nonnus of Panopolis, Dionysiaca translated by William Henry Denham Rouse (1863–1950), from the Loeb Classical Library, Cambridge, Massachusetts, Harvard University Press, 1940. Online version at the Topos Text Project.
 Nonnus, Dionysiaca, Volume I: Books 1–15, translated by W. H. D. Rouse, Loeb Classical Library No. 344, Cambridge, Massachusetts, Harvard University Press, 1940 (revised 1984).  . Online version at Harvard University Press. Internet Archive (1940).
 Smith, William, Dictionary of Greek and Roman Biography and Mythology, London (1873). Online version at the Perseus Digital Library.

Greek trickster deities
Trickster goddesses
Greek goddesses
Personifications in Greek mythology
Deities in the Iliad
Children of Zeus
Children of Eris (mythology)
Deeds of Zeus